Bohdan Ihorovych Kohut (born 10 October 1987) is a Ukrainian professional footballer who plays as a goalkeeper for Veres Rivne.

Career

Karpaty Lviv
He is a product of Karpaty Lviv academy.

Sevastopol
In August 2011 he signed a contract with Ukrainian First League club Sevastopol until June 2014.

Veres Rivne
In 2020 he moved to Veres Rivne and won the 2020-21 Ukrainian First League. On 27 December 2022 he extended his contract with the club until June 2024.

Honours

Club

Veres Rivne
 Ukrainian First League: 2020–21

Individual
 Ukrainian First League Player of the Month: September 2020
 Ukrainian First League Team of the Season: 2020–21

References

External links
 
 
 
 Profile at Karpaty Lviv website 
 Profile at Spartakus Szarowola website 
 

1987 births
Living people
Sportspeople from Lviv
Ukrainian footballers
Association football goalkeepers
Ukrainian expatriate footballers
Expatriate footballers in Poland
Expatriate footballers in Moldova
Ukrainian expatriate sportspeople in Poland
Ukrainian expatriate sportspeople in Moldova
FC Karpaty Lviv players
FC Karpaty-2 Lviv players
FC Lviv players
FC Obolon-Brovar Kyiv players
FC Sevastopol players
FC Sevastopol-2 players
FC Bukovyna Chernivtsi players
CSF Bălți players
FC Desna Chernihiv players
NK Veres Rivne players
FC Volyn Lutsk players
FC ODEK Orzhiv players
Ukrainian Premier League players
Ukrainian First League players
Ukrainian Second League players
Ukrainian Amateur Football Championship players
III liga players